This is the discography page of industrial rock supergroup Pigface.

Studio albums
 Gub (1991)
 Fook (1992)
 Notes From Thee Underground (1994)
 A New High in Low (1997)
 Easy Listening... (2003)
 6 (2009)

Remix albums
 Washingmachine Mouth (1993)
 Feels Like Heaven (1995)
 Below the Belt (1998)
 Headfuck (2003)
 Dubhead (2004)
 Clubhead Nonstopmegamix #1 (2004)
 Crackhead: The DJ? Acucrack Remix Album (2004)
 8 Bit Head (2004)
 17 Ways To Suck (2008)

Live albums
 Lean Juicy Pork (1990; Interview)
 Welcome to Mexico... Asshole (1991)
 Truth Will Out (1993)
 Eat Shit You Fucking Redneck (1998)

Compilations
 The Best of Pigface: Preaching to the Perverted (2001)
 Pigface Vs. The World (2005)
 The Head Remixes (2006; Box set)

Singles and EPs
 Spoon Breakfast EP (1990)
 Empathy/Steamroller 7" Single (1993)
 "Broadcast from Radio China" (Pigface) / "Close Your Cold Eyes" (Snapline) (2006)

Video albums
 Glitch (1993; Invisible)
 Son of Glitch (1996; Invisible)
 90-96 (2003; Underground Inc.)
 United I Tour 03 (2003; Live; Underground Inc.)
 Free for All (2008; Audiovisual)
 Glitch/Son of a Glitch (2008; Audiovisual)
 The Beijing Tapes: Part 1 (2009)

Tribute and cover albums
 From Russia with Love: A Russian Tribute to Pigface (2001; Various artists)

References

Killing Joke
Discographies of American artists